Kvelde is a village in the municipality of Larvik, Norway. Its population was 1058 on 1 January 2018.

The village is located along the banks of the Numedalslågen. The name stems from a local word meaning "turn of the river". Musekollen is the highest point. The local church dates from 1871.

References

Villages in Vestfold og Telemark
Larvik
Populated places on the Numedalslågen